Sir Henry Edwards  (1820 – 4 February 1897) was a British Liberal Member of Parliament for Weymouth and Melcombe Regis from 1867 until 1885, when Weymouth and Melcombe Regis ceased to be a parliamentary borough.

Early life
Born in London, Edwards was the eldest son of John Edwards of Somerton Court, Somerset, and Elizabeth Brayley.

Charity
He made generous gifts to the town – ten cottage homes known as Edwards Avenue and 'Edwardsville' in Rodwell Avenue, and also properties in James Street, all designed for elderly inhabitants of the borough. Sir Henry also provided an annual dinner for the elderly of Weymouth (known as the Edwards Dinner Gift). The properties are all today operated under the name Edwards Homes and run by Weymouth Town Charities who run the Sir Henry Edwards and the Sir Samuel Mico Charities.

Death
Edwards died at his home at 53 Berkeley Square, London, after several months of illness. At the time of his death, he was lauded as the most generous benefactor in the history of Weymouth.

Commemoration
Edwards generosity in Weymouth is celebrated by a statue in Alexandra Gardens on the esplanade, facing north east across Weymouth Bay and the beach.  

The book The Rival Queens, written in 1880 by prominent Weymouth resident Joseph Drew, was dedicated to him.

References

External links 
 
 Weymouth Town Charities: Sir Henry Edwards, with sketches and photographs

1820 births
1897 deaths
Knights Bachelor
Liberal Party (UK) MPs for English constituencies
UK MPs 1865–1868
UK MPs 1868–1874
UK MPs 1874–1880
UK MPs 1880–1885